The Moro National Liberation Front (MNLF) is a political organization in the Philippines that was founded in 1972. It started as a splinter group of the Muslim Independence Movement. The MNLF was the leading organization among Moro separatists for about two decades beginning from the 1970s.

In 1996, the MNLF signed a landmark peace agreement with the Philippine government that saw the creation of Autonomous Region in Muslim Mindanao (ARMM), an area composed of two mainland provinces and three island provinces in which the predominantly Muslim population enjoys a degree of self-rule. Nur Misuari was installed as the region's governor but his rule ended in violence when he led a failed rebellion against the Philippine government in November 2001, and fled to Sabah before being deported back to the Philippines by the Malaysian authorities.

The MNLF is internationally recognized by the Organisation of Islamic Cooperation (OIC) and its Parliamentary Union of OIC Member States (PUIC). Since 1977, the MNLF has been an observer member of the OIC. On January 30, 2012, MNLF became an observer member of the Parliamentary Union of Islamic Cooperation (PUIC), as approved during the 7th PUIC global session held in Palembang, Indonesia.

Background 

The Philippine government wanted to encourage migration of landless Christians from other parts of the country in a so-called Homestead Program (1903–1973). There was no land titling system by the natives of Mindanao at that time, and the Christian settlers exploited the situation. Lanao and Cotabato received an influx of migrants from Luzon and Visayas. Tensions between Moros and Christians were caused by disputes about land ownership and disenfranchisement of Muslims. The Homestead Program is one of the root-causes of the Moro conflict.

Poverty, grievances of the Muslim population, weak rule of law and difficult terrain have made counterterrorism challenging against insurgents in the Southern Philippines.

On March 18, 1968, there was an alleged massacre of Moro soldiers in Corregidor Island. There has been a long-standing allegation that Malaysia provided the initial training and arming of the first batch of MNLF cadres known as "Top 90" in 1969. Likewise, it has also been alleged that Malaysia was either seemingly ignorant or tolerated the illicit arms shipments, mainly from the Middle East, flowing into Mindanao that fueled the insurgency.

The founder and one of disputed leaders of the MNLF is Nur Misuari. The MNLF was founded as a splinter group of the Muslim Independence Movement on October 21, 1972.

MNLF officially claims that its ideology is egalitarianism, and it is not a religious organization like its Islamist splinter group the Moro Islamic Liberation Front.

Leadership and splits 

The MNLF was the leading organization among Moro separatists for about two decades beginning from the 1970s. However, discontent on Nur Misuari's leadership caused the group to unravel especially after the 1996 peace agreement. Integration of former rebels in the society was also a factor in the weakening. At the present there are multiple competing factions. For instance, Hadja Bainon Karon's faction supported peace deal in 2012, after Nur Misuari had criticized it. There was also a case of defections of Moro Islamic Liberation Front (MILF) fighters to MNLF. , the current chairman of the group is uncertain and the sources, including Organisation of Islamic Cooperation and Philippine Government, disagree. Nur Misuari still has support among some of the factions.

Many splits followed tribal affiliation. United Nations Security Council report stated in 2010 that the splinter groups Moro Islamic Liberation Front and Abu Sayyaf recruit and use child soldiers in the conflict.

Peace talks 

Libyan and Muammar Gaddafi's mediation resulted in the Tripoli Agreement on December 23, 1976. It would have established an autonomous region and given Moros influence on foreign policy, military, education, courts, and finances. Areas such as Basilan, Palawan and Sulu would have been included in the autonomous region. The plans failed due to president Ferdinand Marcos' decision to hold a referendum on each area that was to be included in the autonomous region. Most of the regions did not have a Muslim majority. The referendums however did influence Autonomous Region in Muslim Mindanao by creating its predecessors. MNLF decided to continue armed struggle.

The MNLF shifted from demands of full independence to autonomy in the 1980s. In 1986 a ceasefire and attempts to have a peace agreement were made, but they failed.

Autonomous Region in Muslim Mindanao was established in 1989, despite opposition from the MNLF.

OIC, Libya and Indonesia mediated peace talks which were restarted in 1992. Statements of Understanding and Interim Agreements were made between 1992 and 1996. Jakarta Peace Agreement was signed in 1996.

Tensions between the Philippine Government and the MNLF have been fueled by mineral wealth sharing, problems of implementing the peace agreement and the Nur Misuari faction's ongoing opposition of the peace agreement.

In 2015 Nur Misuari rejected reports on the MNLF involvement in the North Borneo dispute and said only the Sultanate of Sulu can pursue the negotiations for the Sabah claim with the Malaysian sides. The MNLF has asserted that their group are not involved in any part of the North Borneo dispute and stressing it is a non-issue as Sabah has become the "home-base for different tribal groupings of Muslims from different regions of Southeast Asia that have enjoyed peaceful and harmonious co-existence with the Chinese and Christian populace in the area."

European Union and the United States do not use the classification of "terrorist" for the MNLF.

Zamboanga City crisis 

In 2013, the Nur Misuari faction of the MNLF declared independence for the Bangsamoro Republik and attacked Zamboanga City. During the MNLF standoff with the Armed Forces of the Philippines, the group was accused by the Philippines of using civilians as human shields, thus leading the Philippine government to label them terrorists. The State Department of the United States included a mention of the siege in its report on "East Asia and Pacific Overview".

Present 

The Moro National Liberation Front under Nur Misuari had talks with President Rodrigo Duterte. Misuari has been meeting with Duterte ever since the signing of the Bangsamoro Organic Law (BOL) in Davao City. Duterte is also considering autonomy to be given to Misuari. Misuari also talked with Duterte about Federalism according to Presidential Spokesperson Harry Roque.

The OPAPP under the orders of President Duterte formed the GPH-MNLF Peace Coordinating Committee in order to fulfill the remaining parts of the 1996 Final Peace Agreement. It also tackles the security and socio-economic problems within Sulu. It also aims to resolve conflicts within Mindanao with the help of MNLF. It also serves as the coordinating committee with the Philippine Government.

On August 12, 2022, Abdulkarim Misuari, Nurrheda Misuari along with 4 others have been appointed as Members of Parliament for the Bangsamoro Transition Authority under President Bongbong Marcos. The appointment lasts until the regular elections for the Bangsamoro Parliament will be held on 2025.

Under the Executive Council of 15, they were part of the Bangsamoro Transition Commission with the Moro Islamic Liberation Front. Yusop Jikiri and Muslimin Sema along with her wife, former Congresswoman Bai Sandra Sema supports the Bangsamoro Organic Law. After the enactment of the Bangsamoro Organic Law, members of the EC-15 got appointed into the Bangsamoro Transition Authority by President Duterte.

Flag 

The Moro National Liberation Front makes use of a flag consist of a golden yellow star and crescent and a kris on a red field. The star represents Truthfulness, Fairness, Equality and Tolerance while the crescent moon symbolizes wisdom. The kris symbolizes strength. The red field represents the Bangsamoro activism, decisiveness, persistence, frugality, and sacrifices in pushing forward the revolutionary struggle for survival, self-determination, and success. The flag design is secular despite having a star and crescent, a symbol often associated with Islam. The flag has not been standardized and many variation exists regarding the scaling of elements in the flag. A variant, with a shahadah on the star and crescent exists. The flag was also used for the Bangsamoro Republik, a widely unrecognized state declared by the group.

See also
Bangsamoro Party

References

Further reading 
 The Long Struggle to Silence the Guns of Rebellion: A Review of the Long and Winding Trail to the Elusive Peace Agreements by The CenSEI Report
 1996 Peace Agreement with the Moro National Liberation Front

External links 
 
 Official blog site of the MNLF Director for Advocacy Communication
 MNLF attacks Marine post in Sulu
 MNLF of Nur Misuari Attack Zamboanga City
 Moro National Liberation Front (MNLF)

Guerrilla organizations
Islam in the Philippines
Rebel groups in the Philippines